Nxai Pan National Park is a national park in north-eastern Botswana, consisting of Nxai Pan, which is one of the Makgadikgadi Pan salt flats. Nxai Pan National Park lies just north of the Maun-Nata main road and adjoins Makgadikgadi Pans National Park on its northern border. The pan itself is a fossil lakebed about 40 square km in size.

The National Park is also home to the cluster of millennia-old baobab trees, which owe their name to Thomas Baines, the man known to have discovered them. Baines’ Baobabs, as they are known today, are a sight sought by many travelers venturing into this untamed terrain of Botswana.

Wildlife

This national park is home to elephant, giraffe, zebra, wildebeest, lion, leopard, cheetah,  kudu, springbok, impala, ostrich, Cape wild dog, jackal, hyena, bat-eared fox, aardwolf, and honey badger.

Conservation 
This park is considered for inclusion in the 5 Nation Kavango - Zambezi Transfrontier Conservation Area.

Roads 
The rainy season which is from November to April is the hot wet summer season and the time when the park is at its best. Game is abundant from December to April but if the rains have been heavy the roads may be difficult to negotiate. Road conditions can become difficult during times of heavy rains. The more accessible time to be in the park is in the dry season, which is from May to September.

References

External links 

Nxai Pan National Park general information

Makgadikgadi Pan
National parks of Botswana
Salt flats of Botswana